Sondor may refer to:

 Sondor District, a district in the Piura Region, Peru
 Sóndor, an archaeological site in the Apurímac Region, Peru
 Sondor (Abancay-Antabamba), a mountain on the border of the Abancay Province and the Antabamba Province, Apurímac Region, Peru
 Sóndor (Cusco), a mountain in the Cusco Region, Peru
 Sondor, an electronics company.